Boss'n Up, a musical film inspired by Snoop Dogg's album R&G (Rhythm & Gangsta): The Masterpiece, debuted on 6 December 2005. The film was released in DVD format, and was the first film made under Snoop Dogg's newly-founded production company Snoopadelic Films.

Snoop Dogg stars as a grocery clerk named Cordé Christopher – a young and magnetic man, subject to keen female interest. He becomes a protégé of Orange Juice, an experienced pimp, after being informed of the better and richer life he can lead as a pimp. OJ cultivates Cordé's "talent" and shares street knowledge with him, including the rules of the pimping "game". To some degree, OJ treats Corde like a son. After achieving success, Cordé has to choose between the love of his life, Chardonnay Allen, and his successful career as a pimp.

The cast includes other musicians like Atlanta rapper Lil Jon, who plays the role of Sheriff, a strip club owner who becomes a partner in Corde's business; Dominique, Corde's attractive attorney who frees him from prison; and comedian Scruncho as Hucky G, Corde's own pimping protégé; the film also features a cameo appearance from music producer and P-Funk member Stan "Quazedelic" Harris.

Box office and business

Awards and nominations

List of songs performed or played in the musical interludes
"Powerful" – performed by Blizzard (of the Block Boiz)
"Perfect" – performed by Snoop Dogg, Pharrell, and Charlie Wilson
"I Love to Give You Light" – performed by Snoop Dogg, Ricky Harris, and Tanya Devine
"Panties Lead-In" – performed by Adam Gillohm and Phillip Rodriguez
"Fresh Pair of Panties On" – performed by Snoop Dogg and J. Black
"The Battle" – performed by Allokol Peete
"Girl Like You" – performed by Snoop Dogg
"The Finer Things" – performed by J. Davey
"Stay" – performed by Jelly Roll
"Get 2 Know Ya" – performed by Snoop Dogg and Jelly Roll
"Closer" – performed by Snoop Dogg
"Promise I" – performed by Snoop Dogg
"Supernatural Things Part I" – performed by Ben E. King
"Boss'n Up (Theme Song)" – performed by Snoop Dogg
"Remember Me" – performed by Larrance Dopson and Lamar Edwards (of T.I.'s new reality show Life on Mars)
"Love Don't Go Through No Changes" – performed by Sister Sledge
"The Bidness" – performed by Snoop Dogg
"Nights Over Egypt" – performed by The Jones Girls
"Can You Control Yo Hoe" – performed by Snoop Dogg and Soopafly
"Drop It Like It's Hot" – performed by Snoop Dogg
"I'm Threw Witchu" – performed by Snoop Dogg
"South" – performed by 4chaluv
"Pass It, Pass It" – performed by Snoop Dogg
"Hustle & Struggle" – performed by J. Black
"Full of Fire" – performed by Al Green
"Helicopter" – performed by Cliff Martinez
"Let's Get Blown" – performed by Snoop Dogg
"O-H-I-O" – performed by The Ohio Players
"I Like Everything About You" – performed by Willie Hutch
"Bongo Instrumental" – performed by Niggerachie
"Butterfly Blues" – performed by Adam Gillohm and Phillip Rodriguez
"I Do I Do" – performed by Leroy Hutson
"Oh No" – performed by Snoop Dogg
"Now at Last" – performed by Feist
"Cold Cold World" – performed by Teddy Pendergrass
"No Thang on Me" – performed by Snoop Dogg and Bootsy Collins
"Step Yo Game Up" – performed by Snoop Dogg, Lil Jon, and Trina
"Ups & Downs" – performed by Snoop Dogg (and The Bee Gees)

Bonus CD
Get 2 Know Ya (Feat. Jelly Roll) (Produced by Jelly Roll) - 03:38
Drop It Like It's Hot (Remix) (Feat. Pharrell & Jay-Z) (Produced by The Neptunes) - 04:16 
No Sticks, No Seeds - 04:19 (Produced by Terrace Martin)
Shake That Shit (Feat. Tiffany Foxxx & Young Watt) (Produced by Terrace Martin)- 03:49 
[ AMG]

Singles
Get to Know Ya - digital download on MSN.

References

BossNup.com (Real Pimps & Hoes- Inspired by the movie BossNup)
DVDtalk

External links 
 
 
 

2005 films
American independent films
Snoop Dogg video albums
2000s musical drama films
American musical drama films
2005 video albums
2005 drama films
2000s English-language films
2000s American films